Munn as a surname may refer to:

Allison Munn (born 1974), American actress
Clarence Munn (1908–1975), college football player and coach
Geoffrey Munn (born 1953), jewellery expert on the BBC's Antiques Roadshow
Gurnee Munn (died 1960), American businessman
Jack Munn, Australian rugby player
John Munn (disambiguation), several people
Kathleen Munn (1887–1974), Canadian artist
Louise Munn (born 1983), Scottish hockey player 
Mancel Thornton Munn (1887–1956), American agronomist and botanist
Mark Munn (born 1953), American ancient historian
Meg Munn (born 1959), British politician
Olivia Munn (born 1980), American actress and TV personality
Orson Desaix Munn, (1824-1907), publisher of Scientific American
Robert Stewart Munn (1829–1894), Newfoundland merchant and politician
Robert Edward Munn (1919–2013), Canadian climatologist and meteorologist
H. Warner Munn (1903–1981), American writer

Munn may also refer to:

 Munn Run, a stream in Ohio